Tin Yiu is one of the 39 constituencies in the Yuen Long District of Hong Kong.

The constituency returns one district councillor to the Yuen Long District Council, with an election every four years. The seat has been currently held by Ho Wai-pan.

Tin Yiu constituency is loosely based on Tin Yiu (I) Estate in Tin Shui Wai with estimated population of 12,734.

History
The seat was held by Leung Che-cheung, member of the Legislative Council for the DAB until 2019.

Councillors represented

Election results

2010s

2000s

1990s

References

Tin Shui Wai
Constituencies of Hong Kong
Constituencies of Yuen Long District Council
1994 establishments in Hong Kong
Constituencies established in 1994